Lisabata-Nuniali, named after two of its dialects, is an Austronesian language of Seram in the Maluku archipelago of Indonesia.

References

Central Maluku languages
Languages of Indonesia
Seram Island